Eleodes obscura is a species of darkling beetle in the genus Eleodes of western North America. It ranges from south-central British Columbia, eastern Washington and Oregon, south to northern Mexico and east to Nebraska, Kansas and Texas.

Description
Each front femur bears an anterior tooth near the tibia. The pronotum lacks obvious forward projections from the anterior corners.

The diet of Eleodes obscura includes dead plant material, animal remains, roots, and seeds.

Gallery

References

Tenebrionidae
Beetles of North America